The Tottenham Marshes are located at Tottenham in the London Borough of Haringey. The marsh is made up of three main areas: Clendish Marsh, Wild Marsh West and Wild Marsh East. The latter two are separated by the River Lea.

Description 

The  marshes are one of the last remaining examples of semi-natural wetland in Greater London. They contain a variety of plant communities typical of a former flood plain location, such as a range of neutral grassland types, sedge marsh, reed swamp, sallow scrub and areas of tall herb vegetation. Associated with this diversity of habitat are several species of plant and insect which are rarely seen in London.

History 
The  of marshes were originally a flood plain of the River Lea. But significant changes have been made over the years. Between the 1860s and 1930 a range of facilities including tennis courts and swimming were available but after World War II between 1946 and 1960 the area was used for gravel extraction and landfill. In the late 19th century the Wild Marsh East was bisected when the River Lea was diverted to accommodate the construction of some of the Lee Valley Reservoir Chain. The marsh was the first home ground of Tottenham Hotspur Football Club in 1882. The Lee Valley Regional Park Authority (LVRPA), created by an Act of Parliament in 1965, bought Tottenham Marshes in 1972.

Ecology 
Plants

Many species of plants can be found on the marsh including:
Wall bedstraw (Galium parisiense)
Yellow vetchling (Lathyrus aphaca)
Bee orchid (Ophrys apifera)
Babington's poppy (Papaver dubilum)
Wurzell's wormwood  (Artemisia vulgaris × verlotiorum)

Butterflies

Brown argus (Aricia agestis)

Birds

Skylark (Alauda arvensis)
Short-eared owl (Asio flammeus)

References

External links
 Friends of Tottenham Marshes
 Tottenham Marshes information

Parks and open spaces in the London Borough of Haringey
Marshland in London
Lee Valley Park
Marshes